Fusui County is a county in the southwest of Guangxi, China. It is the easternmost county-level division of the prefecture-level city of Chongzuo.

Geography

Fusui is located in southwestern Guangxi and in eastern Chongzuo City. It borders Qingxiu District of Nanning in the east, Shangsi County (Fangchenggang) and Ningming County in the south, Jiangzhou District (Chongzuo) in the west, and Long'an County (Nanning) in the north.

The city is located on the north bank of the Zuo River, offering a waterway to Nanning, whence it flows into the Xi River which provides access to Wuzhou and the Pearl River Delta, and is navigable by shallow-draft junks and motor launches, even though it is obstructed by rapids and sandbanks. Travelling upstream the Zuo River leads to Vietnam.

Leiyantai Mountain dominates the southern part of town.

Flora and fauna
Fusui's warm climate gives it a large amount of biodiversity. There are many rare species of animals and more than 1,100 species of plants. National grade one protected animals include white-headed langurs, clouded leopard, musk deer, python more than 30 species. Country grade one protected plant include cycads, and country grade two protected plant include ferns, Jian wood, camphor wood.

Climate
Fusui's climate is humid subtropical and monsoon-influenced. There are 346 frost-free days.

History

Fusui is one of the earliest centers of Zhuang culture. Important sites dating back to the Stone Age have been found here. The Rock Paintings of Hua Mountain along the Zuo River at Yinweng, Qixing, Hetou, Jiaobei, Tuotan, Xiatong, Xinwan, Balai Mountain date back 1800 to 2500 year and are one of the largest groups of pictographs in China and in the world. On several cliff faces are hundreds of large red pictographs depicting a large battle. The red pigment is still bright and vivid and individual figures, weapons, and animals are easy to distinguish. The cliffs, part of the sacred Frog Mountain, were important site to the early Zhuang.

A state seat called Longzhou was first established at the site in AD 638. The state government is located in today's Fusui Xinning town. This became the administrative seat of a commandery. In AD 771, the Longzhou commandery was dissolved, and the state was renamed Xiyuanzhou. In AD 1572, Xiyuanzhou commandery was dissolved, and the state was renamed Xinningzhou. In 1914, Xinningzhou was renamed  Funan County, which could be regarded as the beginning of the county. In 1951, Funan, Tongzheng and Suilu County merged into Fusui County.

Administrative divisions
The county administers 8 towns, 3 townships, which are further divided into a total of 14 residential communities and 119 villages.

 These figures are based on the following official statistics:

Demographics
Fusui's population was 440,000 (2011). 82.8% of the people belong to the Zhuang ethnic group. The rest include Han, Yao, and other ethnic groups.

Economy

Formerly an impoverished county, Fusui from 1992 experienced agricultural growth. The county is surrounded by a fertile agricultural region producing subtropical fruits and sugarcane; food processing, flour milling, sugar refining, meatpacking, and cane sugar manufacture are important in the county. Fusui has been a center for cane sugar, sisal and cement manufacture, and it is also famous in Traveling. According to statistics issued by the Fusui government in 2011, the county's GDP was 101 billion yuan.
Forestry and agriculture are two of Fusui's biggest industries. Rice, beans, oranges, corn, cassava, cinnamon, bananas, vegetables, durian, pineapples, longan, and tea are all major crops, but sugarcane and sisal are the center of Fusui agriculture. Farm raised animals include beef and dairy cattle, sheep, ducks, chicken, geese, bees, turtle, snake and pigeon. Aquaculture for fish is also significant. Chinese medicinal herbs are picked from the wild and also grown. Important mineral resources include manganese, gold, ferberite, coal, iron, aluminium, zinc, cobalt, nickel, calcite, limestone, barite, crystal, marble, and mercuric sulfide. It is China's biggest sugarcane and sisal producer base. Cement and building materials are the center of Fusui industry. Other industries include export infrastructure, paper, forest products such as timber and turpentine, and pharmaceuticals.

Among important companies based in Fusui are:
 Fusui Dongmen Nanhua Sugar Industry Corp
 Fusui Funan East Asia sugar  industrial Corp
 Conch Group Fusui Xinning Conch Cement Corp
 Funan East Asia sugar industrial Corp
 Shanxu Sisal Processing Corp
 Fusui Fuyuan Sisal Corp

Culture

According to the official  Zuo River's Daily newspaper, Zhuang is the first language for 82% of the 440,000 residents of the Fusui, while the other 10% speak mainly Southwestern Mandarin. Other languages such as Iu Mien language are spoken in significant numbers as well.

In Fusu, Zhuang's characteristics on dresses remain on their own, the colors of which are principally conventional navy blue.(commonly known as “blue clothing Zhuang”) Zhuang's men and the women cover their heads with a black or blue scarf. Some women substitute this scarf by a turban that can adopt different forms. They also decorate their shirts with decorations made out of silver.

In Fusui, Zhuang people celebrate many exciting and meaningful festivals such as “Ancestor worship festival in spring” (2 February-Chinese calendar's agrarian calendar), “Tomb sweeping festival” and “Song Festival” (3 March - Chinese calendar's agrarian calendar), “Wheat heat Festival” (also called “Buddha Bath”or “Bovine soul Festival”, 8 April-Chinese calendar's agrarian calendar), “Ghost festival” (14 July - Chinese calendar's agrarian calendar), “Ancestor worship festival in autumn” (8 August -Chinese calendar's agrarian calendar), “bumper harvest festival” (also called “Ten intofestival”or “Nine into festival”, October - Chinese calendar's agrarian calendar).

In addition, Zhuang opera and Cuisine festival are a wealthy local characteristics of folk culture.

Tourism
Fusui is famous for its beautiful natural scenery. The most famous attraction is Rock Paintings of Hua Mountain  along the Zuo River. The rock paintings are believed to be between 1800 and 2500 or between 1600 and 2400 years old. The period of their creations hence spans the times from the Warring States period to the late Han dynasty in the history of China. The paintings are attributed to the ancient Luo Yue people, who are believed to be ancestors of the present-day Zhuang nationality and inhabited the valley of Zuo River during this period. Carbon dating suggests that the oldest paintings were executed around 16,000 years ago whereas the youngest are around 690 years old.

Fusui has beautiful natural scenery and forested mountains numerous species of plants and animals. These features along with unique Zhuang culture and important historical sites make it a famous growing tourist destination.

Scenic spots around Fusui include:
 Rock Paintings along the Zuo River.
 White-headed langur natural reserve in Bapen Township
 Natural scenic landscape along the Zuo River
 Dinosaur park
 Muming pastoral scenery in Changping Township 
 Jinggi rock park
 Gueilongtan scenic area
 Liu Sanjie's tomb
 Huang Xianfan's former residence

Cuisine
Zhuang's cuisine is known for its snacks and the use of spices in Fusui. Zhuang's roasted suckling pig(壮族烤乳猪), Zhuang's sweet potato glutinous rice cake(壮族红薯糍粑) and Zhuang's sliced boiled chicken(壮族白切鸡) is considered the county's Three Cuisine Treasures.

Longtou Township's white cake(龙头白糕) have been the local Zhuang people's breakfast staple since the Qing dynasty and are renowned for their delicate taste. Specifically, the local specialty cuisine are Longtou Township's sauerkraut(龙头酸菜), Longtou Township's roast  pig(龙头烧猪), Dongmen town's Chicken (东门鸡), Dongmen town's Fragrant glutinous rice (东门板包香糯), and Qujiu town's cool cake (渠旧凉糕).

Famous people born in Fusui
 Wu Lingyun (？- 1863)- a Zhuang's hero in Qing dynasty, Zhuang
 Huang Xianfan (1899–1982) - a Chinese historian, ethnologist and educator, Zhuang

References

External links
 Official website of Fusui Government

 
Counties of Guangxi
Chongzuo